Fernando Mendes Soares Gomes (22 November 1956 – 26 November 2022) was a Portuguese professional footballer who played as a striker.

He achieved great success with Porto, during the late 1970s and 1980s. In the Primeira Liga he represented Sporting CP as well, and also spent two years in Spain with Sporting de Gijón.

The recipient of nearly 50 caps for Portugal, Gomes represented the nation in one World Cup and one European Championship.

Club career
Showing great ability since entering FC Porto's youth academy, Porto-born Gomes scored twice in his first-team debut in 1974, scoring twice in a 2–1 win over G.D. CUF. Except for a two-year stint in La Liga with Sporting de Gijón (nearly one year of inactivity due to tendonitis), when most key players left the Estádio das Antas in support of director of football – later president – Jorge Nuno Pinto da Costa, he was in all important moments of the rebirth of the club: the 20-year Primeira Liga drought end in the 1978–79 season, the first UEFA Cup Winners' Cup final against Juventus F.C. in 1984 and, while he missed the 1987 final of the European Cup against FC Bayern Munich after breaking a leg in training days before, he netted five times in the side's victorious campaign, including once in the semi-finals with FC Dynamo Kyiv; he still recovered in time to play in the European Supercup against AFC Ajax and the Intercontinental Cup against Peñarol, on both occasions captaining the winner and scoring the opening goal in the latter game for a 2–1 victory.

In addition, Gomes also won five leagues, three Portuguese Cups and three domestic supercups. Due to personality clashes with Porto's board of directors he signed with Sporting CP, ending his career in 1990–91 after still netting 22 goals in his final season and also helping the Lions to the semi-finals of the UEFA Cup, aged 34.

Gomes retired with Portuguese League totals of 404 matches and 318 goals. His nickname, "Bi-bota", was given after the two European Golden Boot awards he received, in 1983 and 1985. He remained the best goalscorer in the national territory for more than two decades only behind S.L. Benfica's Nené, and later returned to Porto, going on to work with the club in an ambassadorial role.

International career
For the Portugal national team, Gomes scored 13 goals in 47 games from 9 March 1975 until 16 November 1988. His final appearance occurred against Luxembourg for the 1990 FIFA World Cup qualifiers, netting the only goal at the Estádio do Bessa.

Gomes was part of the squads at both UEFA Euro 1984 and the 1986 World Cup, being one of the few players that did not defect from the national side after the latter competition (following the infamous Saltillo Affair) and ending his international career two years later.

Style of play
Apart from being technically a good player, Gomes' talent resided on a fantastic positional sense, which made him very dangerous inside the six-yard box.

Personal life and death
Gomes once quoted: "Scoring a goal is like having an orgasm." Benfica striker Nuno Gomes, who played in the 90s/2000s, chose that nickname in deference to him.

On 17 January 2020, Gomes' daughter Filipa died in mysterious circumstances. She worked in the fashion industry, and was 32.

On 26 November 2022, Gomes died of pancreatic cancer, four days after his 66th birthday. He had been fighting the disease for the three years prior to his death.

Career statistics

Club

International

Scores and results list Portugal's goal tally first, score column indicates score after each Gomes goal.

|}

Honours
Porto
Primeira Divisão: 1977–78, 1978–79, 1984–85, 1985–86, 1987–88
Taça de Portugal: 1976–77, 1983–84, 1987–88
Supertaça Cândido de Oliveira: 1983, 1984, 1986
European Cup: 1986–87
European Super Cup: 1987
Intercontinental Cup: 1987

Individual
Bola de Prata: 1976–77, 1977–78, 1978–79, 1982–83, 1983–84, 1984–85
Taça de Portugal top scorer: 1979–80, 1982–83
European Golden Shoe: 1983, 1985
Portuguese Footballer of the Year: 1983

References

External links

1956 births
2022 deaths
Deaths from pancreatic cancer
Deaths from cancer in Portugal
Portuguese footballers
Footballers from Porto
Association football forwards
Primeira Liga players
FC Porto players
Sporting CP footballers
La Liga players
Sporting de Gijón players
UEFA Champions League winning players
Portugal youth international footballers
Portugal under-21 international footballers
Portugal international footballers
UEFA Euro 1984 players
1986 FIFA World Cup players
Portuguese expatriate footballers
Expatriate footballers in Spain
Portuguese expatriate sportspeople in Spain
FC Porto non-playing staff